Buchwaldoboletus duckeanus is a species of bolete fungus in the family Boletaceae native to South America.

Taxonomy and naming 
Originally described by Rolf Singer in 1983 as Pulveroboletus duckeanus, it was given its current name by Ernst Both and Beatriz Ortiz-Santana in A preliminary survey of the genus Buchwaldoboletus, published in „Bulletin of the Buffalo Society of Natural Sciences” in 2011.

Description 
The cap is convex and viscid. Its color is brown. Easily peeled off the mushroom, the skin is separated from the flesh by a thin gelatinous layer. The pores are small and angular, and the pore surface stains blue with injury. The stipe is subferruginous and tapering, and there is a yellow bluing mycelium at the stipe base.

Spores are small and measure (4)5–6 by (3.3)3.5–4.2(4.5) µm.

Distribution and ecology
Buchwaldoboletus duckeanus has been recorded in Brazil, in Adolfo Ducke Forest Reserve. Like other Buchwaldoboletus species, it is not obligatorily ectomycorrhizal.

References

External links 
 

Boletaceae
Fungi described in 1983
Fungi of South America